Watlington is a village, civil parish and electoral ward in the English county of Norfolk.
It is in the district of King's Lynn and West Norfolk.

The villages name means 'farm/settlement of Hwaetel's/Wacol's people' or perhaps, 'farm/settlement at Wateling (= Wattle/thatching place)'.

Amenities in the village include a public house, Post Office and medical centre with pharmacy. There is also a sports and social club, village hall and church to the north east of the village.

A small nature reserve named 'Watatunga' opened to visitors in July 2020, offering guided buggy tours amongst '170 acres of woodland, grassland and lakes'. This occupies a vast area directly situated between Watlington and the nearby A10 trunk road.

Notes

References
 Office for National Statistics & Norfolk County Council (2001). Census population and household counts for unparished urban areas and all parishes. Retrieved 2 December 2005.

Gallery

External links
 Watlington village website
 
.
Information from Genuki Norfolk on Watlington.

Villages in Norfolk
King's Lynn and West Norfolk
Civil parishes in Norfolk